Pasma is a surname. Notable people with the surname include: 

Hendrik Pasma (1813–1890), Dutch writer, farmer and politician
Tjeerd Pasma (1904–1944), Dutch modern pentathlete
Patrik Pasma (born 2000), Finnish racing driver

given name
Pasma Nchouapouognigni (born 1992), Cameroonian handball player